Colegio Goethe is a German international school in Asunción, Paraguay. The school serves pre-primary education through bachillerato/Abitur-level (senior high school) education.

See also

 Germans in Paraguay

References

External links
  Colegio Goethe

Schools in Asunción
International schools in Paraguay
Asuncion